William Hooker (born 17 May 1796 at Midhurst, Sussex; died 27 December 1867 at Midhurst, Sussex) was an English professional cricketer who played first-class cricket from 1823 to 1833.  A right-handed batsman and occasional wicket-keeper, he was mainly associated with Sussex and made 26 known appearances in first-class matches, including 5 for the Players between 1823 and 1830.

References

External links

Bibliography
 Arthur Haygarth, Scores & Biographies, Volume 1-2 (1744–1840), Lillywhite, 1862

1796 births
1867 deaths
English cricketers
English cricketers of 1787 to 1825
English cricketers of 1826 to 1863
Sussex cricketers
People from Midhurst
Players cricketers
Left-Handed v Right-Handed cricketers